Markus Lynn "Mookie" Betts (born October 7, 1992) is an American professional baseball outfielder for the Los Angeles Dodgers of Major League Baseball (MLB). He previously played for the Boston Red Sox. In 2018, while with the Red Sox, he became the first player in MLB history to win the Most Valuable Player, Silver Slugger, Gold Glove, batting title, and World Series in the same season.

Betts was drafted by the Red Sox in 2011, and made his MLB debut in the 2014 season, splitting time between second base and the outfield. He became the Red Sox center fielder in 2014, before moving to right field in 2016. As a relatively short natural second baseman with a high contact rate and a high level of production when pulling the ball, Betts has been compared to former Red Sox teammate Dustin Pedroia.

Betts is also a professional tenpin bowler for the Professional Bowlers Association (PBA). He bowled a perfect game in the World Series of Bowling in 2017.

Early life

In 2010, Betts's junior year at John Overton High School in Nashville, Betts batted .548 with 24 steals.  In November that year, Betts signed a letter of commitment to attend the University of Tennessee on a baseball scholarship, also getting recruited by Vanderbilt University, Mississippi State University and the University of Alabama at Birmingham.

At Overton, Betts was also a standout basketball player, named MVP of the District 12-AAA league his senior season while averaging 14.1 points, 9 assists, 4 rebounds, and 3 steals per game; and also named Class AAA All-City Player of the Year for the Nashville, Tennessee metropolitan area. His junior year, Betts was named MVP of the District 12-AAA tournament. Betts also excelled in bowling, named the Tennessee boys Bowler of the Year in 2010 with a high score of 290. He grew up bowling at the Donelson Strike and Spare in Donelson, Tennessee.

Professional career

Draft and minor leagues
The Boston Red Sox selected Betts in the 5th round of the 2011 Major League Baseball draft with the 172nd overall pick as a 2nd baseman. After protracted negotiations, Betts subsequently rescinded his commitment to the University of Tennessee, signing a $750,000 contract with the Red Sox organization. Betts played one game in 2011 for the GCL Red Sox of the rookie Gulf Coast League, getting two hits in four at bats. In 2012, he batted .267 and stole 20 bases in 71 games for the short season Lowell Spinners of the New York–Penn League. He played shortstop regularly, but looked more comfortable at second base.

Betts started the 2013 season with the Greenville Drive of the Low A South Atlantic League. In 76 games, Betts batted .296 with a 19-game hitting streak and was selected to the South Atlantic League All-Star Game.

On July 9, Betts was promoted to the Salem Red Sox of the High A Carolina League, batting .341 in 51 games to complete the 2013 season with a combined .314 average in 127 games between Greenville and Salem with 15 home runs and 38 steals. Betts was named Offensive Player of the Year and Breakout Player of the Year in the Boston minor league system, leading all Sox minors players with a .506 slugging percentage, while his .314 batting average ranked him third behind Alex Hassan (.338) and Garin Cecchini (.322). Betts was a second-team inclusion on the Baseball America Minor League All-Star Team for 2013, with the first-team selection for second base going to Marcus Semien, an infielder for the Chicago White Sox. Betts subsequently played 16 games for the Surprise Saguaros of the Arizona Fall League, batting .271.

Betts opened the 2014 season with the Portland Sea Dogs of the Double-A Eastern League, batting .355 in 54 games to lead the Eastern League through June 2. On June 3, Betts was promoted to the Pawtucket Red Sox of the Triple-A International League, batting .322 and reaching base in all 23 games with the PawSox.

In 2013 and 2014, Betts reached base in 66 straight regular-season games plus five playoff games for a combined streak of 71 games. Because official baseball streak records do not include playoff games, Betts's streak has been listed at 66 games; Kevin Millar and Kevin Youkilis hold the official minor league record for consecutive games reaching base, at 71 games, with Minor League Baseball lacking data on the statistic prior to 1997.

Since mid-May 2014, Betts has played outfield in addition to second base. In 2013, four-time All-Star second baseman Dustin Pedroia signed an eight-year, $110 million contract extension with the Red Sox, leading to speculation that the Red Sox would groom Betts for a new position.

Boston Red Sox

2014 season: Rookie season
Betts was promoted to the Red Sox on June 28, 2014. He had previously been selected for the All-Star Futures Game, but was replaced following his promotion to the Major Leagues.

Betts made his debut on June 29, recording his first major league career hit against Yankees starter Chase Whitley in the fourth inning. He hit his first home run on July 2 off the Cubs' Carlos Villanueva. He then was optioned to Triple-A Pawtucket on July 19 when Shane Victorino was activated from the disabled list, and was recalled to Boston on August 1. Betts was optioned back to Pawtucket in August and recalled again on August 18.

On August 29, Betts hit his first career grand slam against Rays pitcher Chris Archer in a Red Sox victory at Tropicana Field. At age 21, Betts became the youngest Sox player to hit a grand slam in 49 years. Betts spent most of the 2014 season playing in the outfield, but on September 11, manager John Farrell announced that Betts would play second base "fairly regularly" following injuries to regular second basemen Dustin Pedroia and Brock Holt.

Betts split the 2014 season fairly evenly between AA, AAA and MLB, playing 52 major league games. He performed well for the Red Sox, hitting .291 with five home runs; and played over half his innings in center field.

2015 season: Shift to right field
On April 6, 2015, Opening Day for the Boston Red Sox against the Philadelphia Phillies, he hit a home run in his second at bat, becoming the third youngest player to hit a home run on Opening Day for the Red Sox. On April 13, 2015, in the home opener at Fenway Park against the Washington Nationals, Betts arguably had the most exciting performance of his career. He robbed Bryce Harper of a home run, stole two bases on one play and hit a home run into the Monster seats, all in the first three innings.

Betts was named the AL Player of the Week for the week ending on June 21, 2015. Within that week, Betts batted .581 (18 for 31) with two home runs, two triples, three doubles, seven RBI and eight runs. He led the AL in batting average, hits, on-base percentage (.594), total bases (31), and slugging percentage (1.000) that week. In the latter part of the season, he spent some time in right field, leading to speculation that he would move there permanently to allow teammate Jackie Bradley Jr., to take over in center field. Betts ended the 2015 season with a .291 batting average, with 92 runs scored, 77 RBIs, 18 home runs, and 21 stolen bases.

2016 season: First All-Star appearance

Betts was selected to the 2016 MLB All-Star Game, the first of his career. He started in right field and was 1-for-2 with a single, and a RBI. Betts was named the AL Player of the Month for July, when he batted .368 (35-for-95) with five home runs, 15 RBIs, five stolen bases and a 1.068 OPS in 23 games. On September 20, Betts became the first player to reach 200 hits during the 2016 MLB season. In 158 games played, Betts finished the season with a .318 batting average, 214 hits, 122 runs scored, 42 doubles, 31 home runs, 113 RBI, and an MLB-leading 359 total bases. His 67 multi-hit games also led MLB. He also was 2nd in the league in power-speed number (28.3).

With the Red Sox finishing the season 93–69, the team clinched the AL East Division but succumbed to a 3-game sweep by the Cleveland Indians in the 2016 ALDS. Wilson Sporting Goods named Betts its Defensive Player of the Year at right field and best overall among all major league fielders. After the season, Betts was named a finalist for the American League MVP Award, alongside Mike Trout and José Altuve. He finished as the runner-up to Trout.

In November, Betts underwent right knee surgery.

2017 season: Second All-Star appearance

From September 12, 2016, through to April 19, 2017, Betts maintained a streak of 129 consecutive plate appearances without a strikeout. The streak ended when Francisco Liriano of the Toronto Blue Jays struck him out. In a regular season game at Toronto, he tied an MLB record when he recorded 8 RBIs from the leadoff slot in a 15–1 rout of the Blue Jays on July 2, 2017. He was granted his second American League All-Star Game selection on the same day. Originally chosen as a reserve, it was announced on July 3 that Betts will start in place of Mike Trout, who was out due to surgery on his thumb.

Betts ended the season with a .264 batting average, 101 runs scored, 26 stolen bases, 24 home runs, and 102 RBIs. Betts led the Red Sox in each of those categories except batting average, as he batted just .236 from the All-Star break through September 4. Despite his solid stats on the season, Betts was criticized for his inability to turn balls in play into hits. His batting average on balls in play fell 54 points from its 2016 level to .268. He also was 3rd in the league in power-speed number (25.0). He won his second consecutive Golden Glove Award this season.

2018 season: AL MVP and First World Series championship
On April 17, 2018, Nick Cafardo of The Boston Globe published a column titled, "Mookie Betts or Mike Trout: Who gets the nod?" in which he compared Betts to Mike Trout, a then-two-time MVP widely considered the best player in baseball. Of the 10 professional evaluators Cafardo asked, seven chose Trout and three chose Betts. "To be in the same conversation as a great player like that is an honor," Betts said. That same night, Betts hit three home runs to lead the Red Sox to a 10–1 win over Trout's Los Angeles Angels. It was the third three-homer game of his career, tying him with Ted Williams for the most in Red Sox history. Betts broke the tie with Williams and set the franchise record on May 2, hitting three home runs in a 5–4 win over the Kansas City Royals. He became the first player in MLB history to produce four three-homer games before the age of 26.

By May 21, Betts had amassed a major league-leading 15 home runs. He led MLB in batting average, slugging percentage, OPS, total bases, extra-base hits, doubles, runs scored, runs created, and OPS+. He led Boston with 11 stolen bases, good for third in MLB. His 3.8 WAR (as calculated by Baseball-Reference.com) at that point was second only to Trout in the majors. His offensive success was a major factor in the Red Sox’ 32–15 start. On June 1, Betts was placed on the 10-day disabled list, retroactive to May 29, with a left abdominal strain; he returned to the active roster on June 11. On July 6, Betts hit his 22nd home run of the season, the 100th of his MLB career. He became the fourth Red Sox player to hit 100 home runs before turning 26, the others being Tony Conigliaro, Jim Rice, and Ted Williams. On July 8, while batting .343 with 22 home runs and 44 RBIs, Betts was named to the 2018 MLB All-Star Game as an American League starting outfielder. In a game against the Toronto Blue Jays on August 9, he hit for the cycle, becoming the 21st player in Red Sox franchise history to accomplish the feat. On September 26,  Betts stole his 30th base of the season, becoming just the second player in Red Sox history to join the 30–30 club (the first was Jacoby Ellsbury in 2011).

Betts finished the 2018 season leading the major leagues with a .346 batting average, a .640 slugging percentage, and 129 runs scored. For the season, he had the highest batting average on balls in play (.373) of all major league players. He also was second in the league in power-speed number (31.0). He had the highest fielding percentage among major league right fielders, at .996. The Red Sox finished the year at 108–54, and went on to win the World Series over the Los Angeles Dodgers. During the postseason, Betts hit 13-for-62 (.210) with one home run and four RBIs. After the season, Betts won his third consecutive Gold Glove, the Heart & Hustle Award, and on November 15 was named the American League MVP, receiving 28 of 30 first place votes, making him the only player in American League history to win the World Series, a Gold Glove award, a Silver Slugger award, and the AL MVP in the same season.

2019 season: Last year in Boston
Prior to the 2019 season, manager Alex Cora stated he would use Andrew Benintendi as the team's leadoff hitter, with Betts batting second, swapping their positions from the team's usual 2018 batting order. At the beginning of June, Cora announced that Betts would again be the team's leadoff hitter since Benintendi went just 3 for 37 in the leadoff spot. At the end of June, Betts had a .261 average with 13 home runs and 37 RBIs. He was selected as a reserve outfielder to the 2019 All-Star Game. On July 26, Betts had the fifth three-homer game of his career, hitting a home run in each of his first three at bats against James Paxton of the Yankees.

For the season, Betts appeared in 150 games while batting .295 with a .915 OPS, 135 runs (leading the major leagues), 29 home runs, 80 RBIs, 40 doubles and 16 stolen bases in 597 at-bats. On defense in 2019, he had a 15 Defensive Runs Saved (DRS) rating, the best in the American League among right fielders, and had the best fielding percentage of all major right fielders (.997). After the season, Betts was awarded his fourth consecutive Gold Glove and his 3rd Silver Slugger. He finished eighth in 2019 AL MVP voting.

Los Angeles Dodgers

2020 season: Second World Series championship 
On February 10, 2020, the Red Sox traded Betts, David Price, and cash considerations to the Los Angeles Dodgers in exchange for Alex Verdugo, Connor Wong, and Jeter Downs. On July 22, the Dodgers signed Betts to a 12-year contract extension, through the 2032 season. The deal was worth $365 million and also included a $65 million signing bonus, making it the richest contract in Dodgers history, and the third-richest contract in the history of North American sports.

The 2020 season was delayed and shortened from 162 games to 60 due to the COVID-19 pandemic. On July 23, Betts was the starting right fielder, making his Dodgers debut on Opening Day against the San Francisco Giants, getting his first hit, a single, as a Dodger against pitcher Tyler Rogers.  On July 31, Betts hit his first home run as a Dodger against Arizona Diamondback pitcher Zac Gallen. On August 13, Betts hit three home runs against the San Diego Padres, his sixth three-homer game of his career, tying Sammy Sosa and Johnny Mize as the only players in MLB history to accomplish this feat. Later that month, Betts hit two home runs and stole two bases against the Colorado Rockies, becoming only the 19th player—and first Dodger—to have a multi-homer, multi-steal game. On August 27, 2020, he reached 1,000 MLB career hits.

Betts finished the 2020 season hitting .292/.366/.562 with 47 runs (4th in the NL), 16 home runs (3rd), 39 RBIs, a .928 OPS, and 10 stolen bases. On his way to his second World Series over a three-season span, Betts made three straight series saving defensive gems in elimination games for the Dodgers in the NLCS against the Atlanta Braves. In the World Series clincher, Betts scored twice and hit a home run. Betts also homered in Game 5 of the ‘18 World Series, when the Red Sox went on to clinch. He became the ninth player to homer in multiple World Series clinchers, and just the second to do it with different teams — joining Reggie Jackson. His eight doubles in the postseason tied a major league record for most doubles in a single postseason. After the season, Betts was awarded his fifth consecutive Gold Glove (first in the National League) and his fourth Silver Slugger. He finished second in NL MVP voting behind Freddie Freeman of the Atlanta Braves.

2021 season: Fifth All-Star appearance 

Betts was selected to the National League All-Star Team, his first appearance with the Dodgers.  He did not play in the game due to injury, having battled back and left shoulder trouble this year. He played in 122 games for the Dodgers, with a .264 batting average, 23 home runs and 58 RBI. In the postseason, he had two hits in four at-bats in the Wild Card Game, nine hits in 20 at-bats (.450) with one home run in the 2021 NLDS and four hits in 23 at-bats (.174) in the 2021 NLCS.

2022 season: Sixth All-Star appearance 
In mid-June, Betts cracked his rib and went on the 10-day injured list. On July 23, Betts hit his 200th career home run off of Alex Wood of the San Francisco Giants.

He was selected as a starting outfielder for the National League All-Star Team, making his sixth appearance at the MLB All-Star game, which was played at Dodger Stadium in 2022. He played in 142 games for the Dodgers in 2022, batting .269 with a career high 35 home runs and recording 82 RBIs. He was tied for the league lead with 117 runs scored.

Bowling
Mookie's mother is an avid bowler and taught Mookie to bowl at an early age. Betts was named the Tennessee Boys Bowler of the Year in 2010, having set Tennessee high school records that season with a 290 game and an 827 three-game series.

Betts competed in the Professional Bowlers Association (PBA) World Series of Bowling in Reno, Nevada in 2015 and 2017.

He has bowled three officially sanctioned perfect 300 games, on January 27, 2013; February 2, 2016; and November 12, 2017. The November 2017 perfect game was achieved in PBA competition, during the 2017 World Series of Bowling.

In February 2019, he won the CP3 PBA Celebrity Invitational, competing with professional bowler Tommy Jones.

Personal life
Although it has been reported that Betts is a nephew of Terry Shumpert, who played parts of 14 seasons with several MLB teams, they are actually first cousins once removed, as Shumpert is a first cousin to Betts' mother, Diana. In 2004, Shumpert spent his final season of professional baseball with the Triple-A Nashville Sounds and worked extensively with Betts. He is a distant cousin of Meghan, Duchess of Sussex.

Betts's first Little League Baseball coach was his mother, Diana.

Betts's parents chose his name in part to form the initials MLB, matching those of Major League Baseball. He has attributed his nickname Mookie to his parents watching former NBA guard Mookie Blaylock play basketball shortly after Betts was born. Betts has stated that he has never met Blaylock.

In 2021, Betts said that he had "made the switch over to vegan."

Betts and his longtime girlfriend, Brianna Hammonds, began dating in high school. The couple welcomed their first child, a daughter, in November 2018. Betts and Hammonds announced their engagement in January 2021 and married on December 1, 2021 in Palos Verdes, California. They have a home in Franklin, Tennessee. Betts also purchased a mansion for $7.6 million in Encino, Los Angeles, when he became a Dodger.

As a member of the Red Sox, Betts became known for his necklaces. One was a gift from a 13-year-old fan, given to Betts during spring training in 2018 prior to his AL Batting Championship, MVP Award and World Series championship. Betts continued wearing the necklace after being traded to the Los Angeles Dodgers, a season which culminated in his second World Championship.

References

External links

1992 births
Living people
African-American baseball players
American bowling players
American League All-Stars
American League batting champions
American League Most Valuable Player Award winners
Baseball players from Nashville, Tennessee
Boston Red Sox players
Gold Glove Award winners
Greenville Drive players
Los Angeles Dodgers players
Lowell Spinners players
Major League Baseball outfielders
Major League Baseball second basemen
National League All-Stars
Pawtucket Red Sox players
People from Brentwood, Tennessee
Portland Sea Dogs players
Salem Red Sox players
Silver Slugger Award winners
Surprise Saguaros players
21st-century African-American sportspeople
2023 World Baseball Classic players